Max Booth III is an author, screenwriter, and publisher best known for his work in the horror field. His nonfiction writing has appeared in LitReactor, CrimeReads, the San Antonio Current, Fangoria, and Film-14. His novella We Need to Do Something is the basis for a film of the same name shot in secret during the 2020 COVID-19 epidemic. In addition to being an author, Booth also co-owns and operates Perpetual Motion Machine Publishing, an independent publishing house, with his wife, Lori Michelle; and serves as the managing editor of Dark Moon Digest, a horror fiction quarterly.

Early life

Booth was born July 4th, 1993 in Lake Station, Indiana. He began writing at the age of seven as a way to cope with the death of his dog. Prior to becoming a published author, he was active on a site called Storiesville.com, which allowed aspiring writers to post their work and receive feedback and criticism; after the site went under, Booth began shopping his own writing around, eventually publishing his first novel, Toxicity, in 2014.

Career

Following the sale of his first novel, Booth published three more books between 2014 and 2016. Concurrently he also founded his own independent press, Perpetual Motion Machine Publishing, with his then-girlfriend (later wife) Lori Michelle. Booth also became the managing editor of Dark Moon Digest, a horror digest for which Michelle serves as the editor-in-chief.

In 2019, Booth came to widespread attention when his fifth novel, Carnivorous Lunar Activities, was published by Fangoria as the third entry in their FANGORIA Presents imprint. In 2020, he published We Need to Do Something, the basis for the film of the same name, which was filmed in secret during the COVID-19 pandemic. The same year, his novel Touch the Night was published by Cemetery Dance.

Bibliography

Novels
 Toxicity (2014)
 The Mind is a Razorblade (2014)
 How to Successfully Kidnap Strangers (2015)
 The Nightly Disease (2016)
 Carnivorous Lunar Activities (2019)
 Touch the Night (2020)
 Maggots Screaming! (2022)

Novellas
 Black (2013)
 We Need to Do Something (2020)

Story Collections
 True Stories Told By a Liar (2012)
 They Might Be Demons (2013)
 Abnormal Statistics (2023)

Anthologies (as editor)
 Zombie Jesus and Other True Stories (2012)
 Zombies Need Love, Too (2013)
 So it Goes: a Tribute to Kurt Vonnegut (2013)
 Long Distance Drunks: a Tribute to Charles Bukowski (2014)
 Truth or Dare? (2014)
 Lost Signals (2016)
 Lost Films (2018)
 Tales from the Crust: An Anthology of Pizza Horror (2019)
 Lost Contact (2021)

References

Living people
21st-century American novelists
1993 births
American horror novelists
Novelists from Indiana
Writers from Indiana
21st-century American male writers